Hallett Sydney Ward (August 31, 1870 – March 31, 1956) was a Democratic U.S. Congressman from North Carolina between 1921 and 1925.

Born near Gatesville, North Carolina, Ward attended public schools in Gates County and then studied law at the University of North Carolina at Chapel Hill. He graduated and was admitted to the bar in 1893, beginning his law practice in Winton, North Carolina.

Ward was first elected to the North Carolina Senate in 1899 and was sent back for a second term in 1901. He served as mayor of the town of Plymouth, North Carolina from 1902 to 1903. In 1904, moved to the town of Washington, North Carolina, where he was named solicitor for the first judicial district of North Carolina, a post he held until 1910.

In 1920, Ward was elected to the 67th United States Congress; he would serve two terms in Washington, DC before declining renomination in 1924, after which he returned to his law practice in North Carolina. He served one additional term in the North Carolina Senate in 1931, and died in Washington, North Carolina in 1956.

External links

1870 births
1956 deaths
Democratic Party North Carolina state senators
University of North Carolina School of Law alumni
Democratic Party members of the United States House of Representatives from North Carolina
Mayors of places in North Carolina
People from Winton, North Carolina
People from Gatesville, North Carolina
People from Washington, North Carolina